This timeline is a selected list of events and locations of the development of the Kimberley region of Western Australia.

See also
 Goldfields-Esperance historical timeline
 Pilbara historical timeline
 Regions of Western Australia

References

Kimberley (Western Australia)
Western Australian regional timelines